The 2016–17 Tulane Green Wave women's basketball team represented Tulane University during the 2016–17 NCAA Division I women's basketball season. The Green Wave, led by 23rd year head coach Lisa Stockton, played their home games at Devlin Fieldhouse and were third year members of the American Athletic Conference. They finished the season 18–15, 7–9 in AAC play to finish in a 4-way tie for fifth place. They lost in the quarterfinals of the American Athletic women's tournament to UCF. They were invited to the Women's National Invitational Tournament where they defeated Texas-Arlington and Grambling State in the first and second rounds before losing to Alabama in the third round.

Media
All Green Wave games will be broadcast on WRBH 88.3 FM. A video stream for all home games will be on Tulane All-Access, ESPN3, or AAC Digital. Road games will typically be streamed on the opponents website, though conference road games could also appear on ESPN3 or AAC Digital.

Roster

Schedule and results

|-
!colspan=9 style="background:#00331A; color:#87CEEB;"| Exhibition

|-
!colspan=9 style="background:#00331A; color:#87CEEB;"| Non-conference regular season

|-
!colspan=9 style="background:#00331A; color:#87CEEB;"| Conference regular season

|-
!colspan=12 style="background:#004731;"| American Athletic Conference Women's Tournament

|-
!colspan=12 style="background:#004731;"| Women's National Invitation Tournament

Rankings

See also
 2016–17 Tulane Green Wave men's basketball team

References

Tulane
Tulane Green Wave women's basketball seasons
2017 Women's National Invitation Tournament participants
Tulane
Tulane